Reno 911!: Miami is a 2007 American cop comedy film based on Comedy Central's Reno 911! and directed by Robert Ben Garant. Distributed in the United States and Canada by 20th Century Fox and internationally by Paramount Pictures alongside Comedy Central Films, the film was released on February 23, 2007 to mixed reviews from critics, most of whom said that fans of the show will appreciate it more than those not familiar with the material.

Plot
The film opens outside a building where terrorists are holding hostages and a nuclear bomb. The Reno Sheriff's Department arrives in a helicopter, called in as experts. As the group prepare to deal with the situation, Deputy Travis Junior wakes up and realizes it was a dream; he was sleeping at the wheel and the vehicle he and Lt. Dangle are in crashes.

The film continues with introductory clips of the officers, telling how they became interested in law enforcement, à la COPS. After a scene involving a chicken in the road miscoded as an "armed person on a roof", Dangle tells everyone that they have been invited to the American Police Convention in Miami Beach. On arrival, the group finds they're not on the entrant list. Having nowhere to stay, they rent rooms at a motel that seems to be a hub of illegal activities. After partying most of the night, most of the police officers unsuccessfully attempt to seduce one another at the motel, with the males eventually turning to pleasuring themselves to the shock of the ones outside.

As everyone recovers from their hangovers, Johnson discovers a tattoo on her breast of a mystery man. The team return to the convention to see if their tickets were found, but discover the building has been the subject of a bio-chemical terrorist attack that has quarantined the police inside. The only city official left outside is assistant deputy mayor Jeff Spoder. The head of National Security asks the Reno Sheriffs Department to provide law enforcement for Miami Beach. A high-ranking SWAT agent, Rick "The Condor" Smith, arrives on the scene to give a pep talk, but soon ends up blowing himself up with a grenade he had unpinned during the talk.

The team assume the Miami Sheriff's responsibilities, and respond to several emergency calls including an alligator in a swimming pool; street prostitution that leads to Reno: 911 regular Terry who is in town to record an album; and a dead beached whale, which they eventually remove by blowing it up. Jones and Garcia are repeatedly kidnapped by Ethan, a drug lord who tries to act like Tony Montana from Scarface. Spoder fires the team for their incompetence, but as the team brings a cake to apologize to him they discover Spoder in cahoots with Ethan to create a drug empire. Spoder kills Ethan and escapes with the bio-terrorism antidote. The team chase Spoder, who holds them at gunpoint until Jones and Garcia arrive in a Marine helicopter and Spoder surrenders. Lt. Dangle arrests him, but Wiegel, who had been siting in the helicopter, accidentally blows Spoder up.

The antidote is distributed, and the Reno Sheriff's Department are eventually congratulated by their peers for their actions. Dangle accepts a job at the Sheriff's Department at Aspen, who had repeatedly turned him down previously. The remaining team are offered a flight back to Reno by Terry, revealed to have a rich father, on his private jet. Back in Reno, Garcia briefs the team on their day's work. Dangle enters, interrupting the briefing, and explains that Aspen has a zero-tolerance policy forbidding homosexual sheriffs. Dangle continues the briefing, and reveals the group have been invited to a convention at Scotland Yard.

Cast

 Carlos Alazraqui as Deputy James Oswaldo Garcia
 Mary Birdsong as Deputy Cherisha Kimball
 Robert Ben Garant as Deputy Travis Junior
 Kerri Kenney-Silver as Deputy Trudy Wiegel
 Thomas Lennon as Lieutenant Jim Dangle
 Wendi McLendon-Covey as Deputy Clementine Johnson
 Niecy Nash as Deputy Raineesha Williams
 Cedric Yarbrough as Deputy S. Jones
 Nick Swardson as Terry Bernadino
 Michael Ian Black as Ron
 David Koechner as Sheriff of Aspen
 Patton Oswalt as Jeff Spoder
 Danny DeVito (cameo) as District attorney
 Dwayne Johnson (uncredited cameo) as Agent Rick "The Condor" Smith
 Paul Rudd as Ethan
 Paul Reubens as Sir Terrence Bernadino
 Marisa Petroro as Ethan's girlfriend
 J. P. Manoux (uncredited) as Naked Armenian

Production

The film stars Thomas Lennon, Ben Garant, Kerri Kenney-Silver, Cedric Yarbrough, Wendi McLendon-Covey, Niecy Nash, Carlos Alazraqui, Paul Rudd, David Koechner, and Mary Birdsong. Certain famed actors make cameos, namely Michael Ian Black (who co-starred with Lennon and Kenney in The State and Viva Variety), Patton Oswalt (Comedian and King of Queens co-star), Danny DeVito (also one of the film's executive producers), Paul Reubens (playing a different character than he plays on the series), Nick Swardson (who appears as his show character "Terry"), and Dwayne Johnson (professional wrestler The Rock). All members of The State appear in the film.

The theme song, "Police and Thieves", is performed by Dave Grohl of the Foo Fighters and subsequent theme song "Do Little Things", is performed by "Changing Faces and Ivan Matias".  This is alluded to by Lennon, Garant, and Kenney-Silver on one of the audio commentaries, who say they are not allowed to discuss who performed the song, but say viewers should "Google it" to find the answer.

The film reprises some jokes from the original series for the benefit of first-time viewers, an example being Dangle's explanation for wearing shorts on the job, which was also featured in the first episode of the series.

Filming
Principal photography took place throughout March 2006 in Miami and Southern California.

Reception

Box office
Reno 911!: Miami opened in 2,702 venues and earned $10,273,477 in its debut, ranking fourth in the North American box office and second among the week's new releases. The film ended its run on May 3, 2007 with $20,342,161 domestically and $1,679,101 overseas for a worldwide total of $22,021,262. Based on a $10 million budget, the film was a moderate success.

Critical response
The film received mostly mixed reviews from critics. It holds a 34% rating on review aggregator website Rotten Tomatoes based on 96 reviews, with an average of 5/10. The site's consensus states: "Reno 911! anarchic brand of comedy loses much in translation to the big screen where it feels slapdash and shallow." Metacritic reports a 47 out of 100 score based on 22 critics, indicating "mixed or average reviews".

Home media
In North America, the DVD was released in two versions on June 19, 2007, an unrated version and the theatrical version. The DVD sold 894,739 units, which gathered a revenue of $16,282,178.

A second unrated cut was released on September 9, 2008.

Cancelled and potential sequel

Writers Garant and Lennon stated in their book Writing Movies for Fun and Profit, that a sequel would not be produced because of insufficient box office returns with the first movie. In the book, a treatment, or extensive outline of what the sequel would have been is included, entitled Reno 911!: SOS. The plot involved the characters of Reno 911! getting stuck on a deserted island with a serial killer on the loose.

References

External links
 
 
 
 
 UGO interview with Thomas Lennon by Daniel Robert Epstein 
  Blue Food interview with Thomas Lennon, Ben Garant & Kerri Kenney-Silver by David Salcido

2007 films
2000s English-language films
American police films
20th Century Fox films
American parody films
American LGBT-related films
Comedy Central films
Films based on television series
Films directed by Robert Ben Garant
Films produced by Danny DeVito
Films set in Miami
Films shot in California
Films shot in Miami
American mockumentary films
2000s parody films
2000s police comedy films
Paramount Pictures films
2007 LGBT-related films
2007 directorial debut films
2007 comedy films
2000s American films